Freema Agyeman (born Frema Agyeman; 20 March 1979) is an English actress. She rose to fame with her role as the Doctor's companion Martha Jones in the BBC science fiction series Doctor Who (2007–2010), and received further recognition for playing Crown Prosecutor Alesha Phillips in the ITV crime procedural Law & Order: UK (2009–2012), Amanita Caplan in the Netflix science fiction drama Sense8 (2015–2018) and Dr. Helen Sharpe in the NBC medical drama New Amsterdam (2018–2022). 

Following her departure from Doctor Who, Agyeman reprised her role as Martha Jones in the Doctor Who spin-off series Torchwood and had a part as Tattycoram in the BBC period miniseries Little Dorrit (both 2008). In 2013, she made her US television debut in The CW's Sex and the City prequel series, The Carrie Diaries, as magazine editor Larissa Loughlin.

Her other television appearances include Old Jack's Boat (2013), Silent Witness (2005) and Survivors (2008). Agyeman has also appeared in films, including The Matrix Resurrections (2021), Eat Locals (2017) and North v South (2015). She also played a brief role in "Friends" season ten (2004) where her character, Yemelaina, fell down the stairs in the apartment.

Early life
Agyeman was born in London on 20 March 1979. Her mother, Azar, is Iranian Kurdish, and her father, Osei, is Ghanaian. They divorced when she was young. Agyeman has an older sister, Leila, and a younger brother, Dominic.

Although her mother was raised as a Muslim and her father was raised as a Methodist, Agyeman grew up to be a practising Roman Catholic. Agyeman attended Our Lady's Convent RC High School, a Catholic school in Stamford Hill. Later, during the summer of 1996, she attended the Anna Scher Theatre School in Islington and studied performing arts and drama at Middlesex University, graduating in 2000. She also took a theatrical course at Radford University in Virginia in 1998, even volunteering to work as a box-office assistant for student drama productions in which she was not cast.

Career

Early work
When Agyeman began her professional acting career, she chose to use a different spelling of her birth name, Frema, as her professional name, to avoid pronunciation problems.

Before securing the part of Martha Jones in Doctor Who, Agyeman's most famous television role was playing Lola Wise in the revived series of the ITV soap opera Crossroads. For her performance, she was nominated in two categories, Best Newcomer and Sexiest Female, at the 2003 British Soap Awards. Agyeman also had small guest roles in such TV series as BBC's long-running medical drama Casualty, Sky One's airline drama Mile High and ITV's police procedural The Bill, in which she appeared twice as two separate characters. In 2005, she played Mary Ogden, a scene of crime officer, in an episode of Silent Witness.

Agyeman made her feature film debut in 2006, playing Nana in the independent drama Rulers and Dealers (2006), written and directed by Stephen Lloyd Jackson.

Doctor Who and Torchwood 

Agyeman auditioned for three roles in the 2006 series of Doctor Who. On 24 June 2005, she auditioned for the part of Sally Jacobs in "The Christmas Invasion", but the role went to Anita Briem, who better fitted the production team's concept of the character as an "ice cool blonde". Agyeman later auditioned for the roles of Esme and Adeola Oshodi, in the "Rise of the Cybermen"/"The Age of Steel" and "Army of Ghosts", respectively. Esme was ultimately cut from the final script, but Agyeman was successful in her audition for Adeola. She filmed her role in the series in December 2005 and appeared on screen as Adeola on 1 July 2006. Agyeman studied dance and practised horse riding, martial arts and gymnastics, a fact that the producers exploited to provide her with more physically arduous action scenes.

The production team were impressed by the versatility shown by Agyeman across her three auditions and called her back as a serious candidate for the new companion. She attended another audition (ostensibly for an episode of Torchwood) before a final screen test with Tenth Doctor actor David Tennant. Tennant left a reassuring note under the door of Agyeman's hotel room, and this helped calm any nerves the actress had. Following extensive speculation on who would replace Billie Piper, Agyeman was confirmed to the press as new companion Martha Jones on 5 July 2006.
Agyeman began filming for the third series in August 2006 and finished in March 2007. She made her screen debut as medical student Martha on 31 March 2007 in the episode "Smith and Jones". A line of dialogue explains that Adeola was Martha's cousin. Agyeman continued to portray the character throughout every episode of the series. In the series finale, "Last of the Time Lords", Martha left the Doctor of her own accord after recognising how unhealthy their relationship had become, but promised that she would see him again. Agyeman also voiced the character in the animated serial The Infinite Quest, which aired in twelve weekly segments during the run of the 2007 series.

In 2007, Agyeman's performance as Martha was praised at several award ceremonies. In June, she was named Best Newcomer at Glamour's Women of the Year Awards. In October, she won the People's Choice category for Favourite Female TV Star at the 5th Screen Nation Film & TV Awards and became one of the top four nominees for Most Popular Actress at the 13th National Television Awards. The role also got her nominations in the Best Actress categories at the TV Quick Awards and the Golden Nymph Awards. In December, The Observer had an interview with Agyeman and named her as one of their Faces of 2007.

The following year, Agyeman returned as Martha in five episodes of the fourth series of the show. Following the series finale, Agyeman stated that she would be open to reprising the role. She later returned to the series along with several other former cast members to mark David Tennant's final appearance in "The End of Time". Concurrent with her appearance on the show, Agyeman read abridged audiobook adaptations of five of the Doctor Who New Series Adventures novels featuring Martha, namely The Last Dodo, Wetworld, The Pirate Loop, Martha in the Mirror and The Story of Martha.

In between the third and fourth series of Doctor Who, Agyeman appeared in three episodes of the show's spin-off drama Torchwood, namely "Reset", "Dead Man Walking" and "A Day in the Death". She also had a starring role in the Torchwood radio play "Lost Souls", broadcast on BBC Radio 4 on 10 September 2008 to promote the activation of the Large Hadron Collider at the CERN research facility on that same day. It was later revealed by director Euros Lyn that the production team had intended for Agyeman to also appear in the third series of Torchwood, but she was already committed to Law & Order: UK.

In February 2020, she reprised her role as Martha in the Torchwood audio drama "Dissected", produced by Big Finish Productions. In July 2021, a new three-part audio series starring Agyeman was announced, The Year of Martha Jones. It was released in December and depicted Martha during the year she spent travelling the Earth in the third series finale of Doctor Who.

Other work 
Agyeman appeared several times on The Bedtime Hour on CBeebies, reading the story broadcast shortly before 7.00 pm. She narrated the first series of BBC Three's hospital documentary series Bizarre ER, which ran from 14 February to 3 April 2008 and also provided the narration for a second series which began airing on 21 April 2009. Agyeman hosted a Doctor Who-themed portion of the BBC Proms on 27 July. A one-hour cut-down version of the prom made its TV debut on BBC One, New Year's Day, 2009.

Agyeman played foundling girl Tattycoram in the Emmy Award-winning 2008 BBC adaptation of Charles Dickens's Little Dorrit, which began on 26 October 2008, starring alongside her fellow Torchwood co-stars Eve Myles and Ruth Jones. Some of Agyeman's scenes for the first episode were shot in the grounds of Deal Castle, Kent, which doubled for Marseille, France. Agyeman was delighted to have appeared in Little Dorrit, as it had always been a dream of hers to appear in a period drama. In 2008, Agyeman also appeared in Survivors, a BBC One remake of the cult 1970s TV series, as Jenny Walsh (surname was originally reported to be Collins), although her character was killed off in the first episode in a shock twist despite featuring prominently in promotional materials for the series.

Between 2009 and 2012, Agyeman appeared as Crown Prosecutor Alesha Phillips in Law & Order: UK, a UK adaptation and spin-off from the US Law & Order franchise. Agyeman is a self-professed "massive fan" of the original Law & Order series, especially the third and fourth seasons. In preparation for the role, Agyeman sat in on live trials, toured the Old Bailey, and conferred with her law-degree-holding sister, Leila: "She's great and really patient at explaining things to laymen, because I was coming at it completely blind. She's been a good source." She remained with the programme for its first six series departing the cast before the seventh series due to other filming commitments. For her role as Alesha Phillips, Agyeman was longlisted for the National Television Awards for Outstanding Drama Performance several times. She was also nominated for Best UK Actress at the 2009 Birmingham Black International Film Festival's Music, Video and Screen Awards.

In March 2012, it was announced that Agyeman would play Larissa, "an easy-going party girl who works at Interview magazine" in the pilot of the Sex and the City prequel The Carrie Diaries (2013–2014). In early 2013, she starred in the CBeebies television series Old Jack's Boat as Shelley.

In 2015, Agyeman appeared in the Netflix series Sense8 (2015–2018), created by J. Michael Straczynski and Lilly and Lana Wachowski. She played series regular Amanita Caplan, the girlfriend of Nomi, a trans woman blogger and hacktivist. In the same year, she starred as Penny, a woman embroiled in a crime war between northern and southern UK gangs, in the film North v South. The film was poorly received by critics, but earned Agyeman nominations at both the Screen Nation Film & TV Awards and the National Film Awards. Her other film appearances include the role of Angel in the vampire film Eat Locals (2017), co-starring Charlie Cox, and a small part as Astra in the science fiction blockbuster The Matrix Resurrections (2021).

In 2018, Agyeman became a member of the main cast of the NBC medical drama series New Amsterdam, playing the role of Dr. Helen Sharpe, the head of the oncology and hematology department. In July 2022, she announced that she would not be returning to New Amsterdam for its fifth and final season, instead signing up for Sky Max's comedy drama Dreamland, which will feature singer Lily Allen in her first television lead role.

Personal life
The tattoo Agyeman has on her upper arm is symbolic of her ancestry, containing the Persian word "raha", meaning "free", under an image of a butterfly.

Agyeman is a non-church-going Roman Catholic. She has stated that doing good is her way of believing in God and expressing Catholic Christianity.

Filmography

Film

Television

Audio and radio

Theatre

Awards and nominations

References

External links

 
 
 Interview on The One Show (14 August 2006)
 Interview in The Times (16 February 2008)
 Survivors – Freema Agyeman (Jenny Collins) Press Pack at the BBC Press Office
 Little Dorrit – Freema Agyeman (Tattycoram) Press Pack at the BBC Press Office

1979 births
Living people
21st-century English actresses
Actresses of Iranian descent
Actresses from London
Alumni of Middlesex University
Black British actresses
British actresses of Asian descent
English film actresses
English people of Ghanaian descent
English people of Iranian descent
English radio actresses
English Roman Catholics
English stage actresses
English television actresses
English voice actresses
People from Manor House, London